Millville, Indiana may refer to:

Millville, Franklin County, Indiana, an unincorporated community
Millville, Henry County, Indiana, an unincorporated community in Liberty Township